Williston is a surname. Notable people with the name include:

 David Williston (1868–1962), American landscape architect
 Edward Bancroft Williston (1837–1920), officer in the United States Army
 George H. Williston (1818–1881), American state and territorial legislator
 Lorenzo P. Williston (1815–1887), American lawyer and politician
 Ray Gillis Williston (1914–2006), Canadian educator and politician
 Samuel Wendell Williston (1851–1918), American paleontologist
 Samuel Williston (1861–1963), American lawyer